Il Caffè (Italian: The Coffeehouse) was an Italian magazine which was published in Milan between 1764 and 1766. It was the most significant publication of the Enlightenment period in the country.

History and profile
Il Caffè was first published in June 1764. The founders were brothers, Alessandro and Pietro Verri. They also directed the magazine which inspired from The Spectator and The Tatler, English publications. It covered articles concerning economics, agronomy, natural history and medicine. The most known contributor of Il Caffè was Cesare Beccaria, a philosopher and economist. It was folded in May 1766 due to the disputes between Verri and Beccaria.

References

External links

1764 establishments in Italy
1766 disestablishments in the Holy Roman Empire
Defunct magazines published in Italy
Italian-language magazines
Magazines established in 1764
Magazines disestablished in 1766
Magazines published in Milan